The 1928 United States Senate election in Ohio took place on November 6, 1928. Incumbent Republican Senator Simeon Fess was re-elected to a second term in office over Democratic Director of Agriculture Charles Truax.

General election

Candidates
Simeon Fess, incumbent Senator since 1923 (Republican)
James Goward (Socialist Labor)
J. Wetherell Hutton, Quaker schoolmaster (Prohibition)
Charles Truax, Ohio Director of Agriculture (Democratic)
Joseph Willnecker (Workers)

Results

See also 
 1928 United States Senate elections

References

Ohio
1928
1928 Ohio elections